The J. Tuzo Wilson Medal is given out annually by the Canadian Geophysical Union to recognize scientists who have made an outstanding contribution to the field of geophysics in Canada.  Factors taken into account in the selection process include excellence in scientific or technical research, instrument development, industrial applications and/or teaching. The award was created in 1978 and named after its first recipient, John Tuzo Wilson.

Past recipients
Source: CGU

See also

 List of geology awards
 List of geophysics awards
 List of physics awards

References

Wilson Medal recipients
Canadian science and technology awards
Geology awards
Awards established in 1978
1978 establishments in Canada